Moei Wadi is a district (amphoe) in the northern part of Roi Et province, northeastern Thailand.

Geography
Neighboring districts are (from the east clockwise): Nong Phok and Phon Thong of Roi Et Province; Kuchinarai of Kalasin province; and Nong Sung of Mukdahan province.

History
The minor district (king amphoe) Moei Wadi was established on 1 April 1978, when the two tambons, Moei Wadi and Chumphon, were split off from Phon Thong district. It was upgraded to a full district on 3 November 1993.

Administration
The district is divided into four sub-districts (tambons), which are further subdivided into 43 villages (mubans). There are no municipal (thesabans); there are four tambon administrative organizations (TAO).

References

External links
amphoe.com (Thai)

Moei Wadi